Charles Van Iderstine Mansion is a historic home located at Centerport in Suffolk County, New York. It was built in 1897 and is a large, rambling -story clapboard, shingled and shiplap sided residence with a varied gable roof. It features a 3-story octagonal tower with a bell roof and a balustraded sleeping porch.

It was added to the National Register of Historic Places in 1985. In 2019, the house was placed for sale for $2,989,000.

References

Houses on the National Register of Historic Places in New York (state)
Houses completed in 1897
Houses in Suffolk County, New York
National Register of Historic Places in Suffolk County, New York